Huser or Hüser is a surname. Notable people with the surname include: 
France Huser (born 1939), French novelist and art critic
Geri Huser (born 1963), American politician
Glen Huser (born 1943), Canadian fiction writer 
Kirsten Huser Leschbrandt (born 1945), Norwegian politician
Lilay Huser (born 1958), German-Turkish actress 
Pascal Huser (born 1995), Dutch football player 
Robin Huser (born 1998), Swiss football midfielder 
Uwe Hüser (born 1958), German politician